Kasper is a German surname.  Notable people with the surname include:

Adam Kasper, American record producer
Antonín Kasper (disambiguation), several people with this name
Dave Kasper, American soccer player
Debbie Kasper, American television writer and comedian
Drew Kasper, American amateur and professional wrestler known as Brutus Creed
Gian-Franco Kasper (1944–2021), Swiss ski official
Herbert Kasper (born 1926), American fashion designer
Jacob Kasper, American amateur and professional wrestler known as Julius Creed
Jan Kasper (1932–2005), Czech ice hockey player
John Kasper (1929–1998), American activist
Julia Kasper, New Zealand entomologist
Kevin Kasper (born 1977), American football player in the National Football League
Kalle Käsper, Estonian writer
Len Kasper (born 1971), American television broadcaster for the Chicago Cubs
Ludwig Kasper (1893–1945), Austrian sculptor
Lynne Rossetto Kasper, American food writer and radio journalist
Marco Kasper (born 2004), Austrian ice hockey player
Manuela Kasper-Claridge (born 1959), German journalist
Nolan Kasper (born 1989), American alpine skier
Philip H. Kasper (1866-1942), American farmer and businessman
Rick Kasper, Canadian mason and politician
Steve Kasper (born 1961), Canadian ice hockey player
Walter Kasper (born 1933), German clergyman

See also
Käsper (surname), Estonian surname
Kasper (disambiguation), including more people with similar surnames
Casper (disambiguation)

German-language surnames